There are a number of occupational hazards of grain facilities. These hazards can be mitigated through diligence and following proper safety procedures. Grain Facility Occupation Exposure is the quantifiable expression of workplace health and safety hazards a grain-handling facility employee is vulnerable to in performing their assigned duties.  Exposure represents the probability that a given hazard will have some level of effect of a receptor of interest.  This page utilizes data and information regarding grain facility occupational exposure in the United States.

The agricultural industry is consistently ranked as one of the most dangerous industries, with a fatality rate (24.9 deaths per 100,000) nearly seven times higher than the fatality rate for all private industry workers (3.5 deaths per 100,000).  From 2003 to 2011, fatalities resulting from work-related injuries in agriculture totaled 5,816.  On average, 243 agricultural workers suffer a serious “lost-work-time” injury, with five percent of these incidents resulting in permanent impairment.  In 2012, the agricultural facilities reported 475 fatalities, thus making the sector with the industry with the highest fatal injury rate of any industry sector for the second year in a row, at 21.2 fatal injuries per 100,000 full-time workers.

While there are many different areas within the agriculture industry, this page will specifically limit its scope to grain-handling/storage facilities (such as grain elevators and grain storage bins).  In grain-handling facilities, workers are exposed to a wide variety of occupational health and safety issues with the potential to significantly affect well-being of workers.

Exposure hazards

Suffocation or engulfment 
 
Hazard definition
Grain entrapment occurs when victims are partially submerged in grain and are unable to remove themselves; grain engulfment occurs when victims are completely submerged in grain and unable to remove themselves.  Grain engulfment seems to mainly occur at grain storage facilities such as silos or grain elevators, but can also transpire anywhere large quantities of grain are located, including freestanding outdoor piles. Grain entrapment incidents can occur very rapidly, taking only a few moments to completely submerge a worker, minutes to suffocate, and hours to locate and recover.  Rescuing someone who has become engulfed in grain may be possible if the victim's airway remains unobstructed and they are able to continue breathing.

In the United States in 2010, 57 workers were engulfed in grain, resulting in 26 fatalities.  In 2012, 19 workers were engulfed in grain, resulting in 8 fatalities.

Engulfment conditions/scenarios/causal pathway

Out-of-condition grain

Research has identified a link between out-of-condition grain and incidents of grain engulfment.  Out-of-condition grain refers to stored grain that has become wet, clumped or has spoiled.  Out-of-condition grain can increase occupational exposure to grain engulfment because of a tendency of low-quality grain to stick/clump together.  When grain becomes excessively crusted together and/or cakes to walls of storage bins, workers enter grain bins to loosen grain to facilitate its removal.  Below is a high-level overview of the causal pathway leading to grain entrapment:
 
Workers in the grain can become entrapped three ways:
Entering a storage bin while grain is flowing.
 When standing/walking on an apparently stable surface that is actually a "grain bridge" (A hollow cavity that forms underneath a hardened surface layer of grain). 
 A vertical mass of grain settled against a wall may suddenly give way while being cleared.
 
Entering bin to dislodge clumped grain
 Out of condition grain (wet/moldy/etc.) is stored.
 Out of condition grain “cakes” the side of the bin or “bridges” across the bin.
 Worker enters storage unit to break up/dislodge out of condition grain.
 Out of condition grain collapses and the worker becomes engulfed.

Entering bin during grain removal
 Worker enters storage bin.
 Auger starts to remove grain
 Worker becomes entrapped within 4 to 5 seconds.
 Worker becomes engulfed within 11 seconds.

Other factors that have been found to have a statistically significant relationship with grain engulfment incidents include grain type being stored/handled, geographic location of engulfment, type of facility, and victim demographics.
Greater than half of recorded incidents of entrapment/engulfment occur in corn; other grains in which individuals have been entrapped include soybeans, oat, wheat, flax, and canola. As corn is largely produced and stored in the Corn Belt states (Illinois, Indiana, Iowa, Minnesota and Ohio), most incidents of engulfment occur in these states.  In another study, 60 cases of reported grain entrapment were analyzed and it was found that 43% of the cases involved corn while another 22% involved soybeans.

As it was mentioned in the ‘’’exposed systems and populations’’ more than 70% of entrapments have occurred on small or family farms that are typically exempt from OSHA grain-handling regulations.  Engulfment victims have been exclusively male; 75% have been farmers, farm workers, or members of farm families. The average age of victims is around 40 years, however a disproportionate share of victims are under 18 years.

Grain dust explosions 

Hazard definition

Nearly any finely-divided organic substance becomes an explosive material when its dispersed as air suspension; hence, a very fine flour found in grain-handling facilities can potentially become dangerously explosive in air suspension.

Exposure conditions/scenarios/causal pathway

Elements needed for a fire (the familiar "Fire Triangle"):
 Combustible dust (fuel);
 Ignition Source (heat); and
 Oxygen in air (oxidizer).

Additional elements needed for a combustible dust explosion:
 Dispersion of dust particles in sufficient quantity and concentration; and
 Confinement of the dust cloud

Falls from heights 

Hazard definition

In 2011, the Bureau of Labor Statistics (BLS) reported a non-fatal, fall-related injury rate of 48.2 per 100,000 workers in the agricultural industry (a rate higher than reported for the transportation, mining, or manufacturing industries).  Additionally, the BLS reported 167 worker fatalities in the agriculture industry between 2007 and 2011.

Falls from height can occur throughout a grain-handling facility. Data has illustrated that relatively short falls, from 12 to 20 feet, can be fatal.  Examples of surfaces that could present a falling hazard to grain-handling employees might include floors, machinery, structures, roofs, skylights, unguarded holes, wall and floor openings, ladders, unguarded catwalks, platforms and manlifts.  Additionally, workers are also exposed to potentially fatal falls as they move from the vertical exterior ladders on grain bins to the bin roof or through a bin entrance.
Between 1985 and 1989, falls from heights were the second leading cause of grain-handling worker fatalities.
Falls from machinery and structures were the second largest single cause of grain- and silage-handling fatalities between 1985 and 1989; falls from structures accounted for 79 percent of these fatalities.

Amputations from grain-handling equipment 

Hazard definition

Mechanical equipment within grain storage structures, such as augers and conveyors, present serious entanglement and amputation hazards. Workers can easily get their limbs caught in improperly guarded moving parts of such mechanical equipment.

Exposure conditions scenarios/causal pathways

While many pieces of equipment may possess safety features such as guards, covers, and shields that are designed to protect individuals from potential amputations or other related injury, workers increase injury exposure when attempting to disable protective features.

Airborne contaminants 

Hazard Definition

Grain storage structures can develop potentially hazardous atmospheres due to gases produced from fermenting grains and/or fumigation.  Fumigants in grain storage bins are commonly used for insect control.  Exposure to fumigants can cause central nervous system damage, heart and vascular disease, and lung edema as well as cancer.  In addition to the direct health risks associated with fumigant exposure, exposure to these gases can also result in worker incapacitation and subsequently suffering injury from falling or suffocation from engulfment.  Grain facility workers involved with handling fumigants and/or fumigated grain are exposed to these potentially hazardous contaminants.  Fermenting or molding grain produce nitric oxide (NO), and also compounds known to be respiratory irritants such as nitrogen dioxide (NO2) and nitrogen tetroxide (N2O4).  While low NO2 concentrations can cause coughing, labored breathing, and/or nausea, high concentrations can cause fluid to fill the lungs, which can result in death.

Exposure conditions/scenarios/causal pathways

Hazardous gas concentrations are generally highest within the first 48 hours after silage has been added to the container, but may still be present for roughly four weeks.  The hazardous gases produced from fermenting silage (NO2 and NO4) are heavier than air and typically can be reduced in silos by means of opening the containers chute doors.  Even when airing out the bin, potentially fatal concentrations of these gases may still exist in collections in confined spaces the air space between the bottom of the silo chute door and the top of the silage.  Workers can be exposed to hazardous gases, and could even inhale fatal doses of the contaminants if they fall, or bend over to work or pick up a tool, or even if the gas is stirred up by a draft or the workers' activity.

Exposed systems and populations

Young workers

Of all recorded cases of grain engulfment, more than 60% of these cases occur at facilities that are not subject to OSHA regulations, mainly at family on-farm grain storage units.  Of all recorded cases of grain engulfment at OSHA-exempt facilities, 70% of those cases involve children.  The Department of Labor proposed, in 2011, sweeping regulations that would prohibit underage workers from entering grain silos and other hazardous activities.  Another study found that roughly one in five grain entrapments involve a child.

Mitigating risk

Entrapment 

Agricultural organizations have worked to protect their workers by improving entrapment and other confined space rescue techniques, as well as by advocating increased awareness among farmers of engulfment prevention methods. Primary among these is a federal regulation that forbids opening an auger or other opening at the bottom of a grain storage facility while someone is known to be "walking down the grain" within.
Workers entering a grain bin are required to be equipped with a body harness which is tethered to a lifeline manned by at least two other individuals outside of the bin.  Experts warn that workers should not enter a bin of flowing grain. Caution and awareness of grain quality is necessary prior to entering a bin. Lock out/tag out of power equipment (such as augers) prior to entering the bin is also necessary.

Dust explosions 

Good housekeeping practices, specifically the elimination of potentially combustible dust accumulation, can help mitigate the probability of an explosion to occur.
OSHA recommends grain-handling facilities identify potential explosion contributors through conducting a thorough hazard assessment of:
 All materials handled;
 All operations conducted, including by-products;
 All spaces (including hidden ones; and
 All potential ignition sources

Falls 

Reducing exposure

Worker exposure to falls can largely be mitigated through implementing and adhering to basic safety practices. A few basic safety practices to reduce worker exposure to falls might include:

 Keep all ladders in good condition.
 Avoid climbing ladders in wet or icy conditions. 
 Use a locking cover and/or pull-down section for the first 6–8 feet of permanent ladders (to prevent access by children or other unauthorized persons).

Reducing potential effect (given that a worker is exposed to falls)
Equipment is also available to prevent serious injuries in case a fall does occur:
 Waist belt or body harness and a lanyard would be used in order to limit the distance a worker can fall. 
 Knots reduce strength of ropes by about 50 percent; rope with end loops woven by the manufacturer are much stronger.
 Passing a rope around a sharp corner will reduce the rope's strength by about 70 percent. 
 Sunlight, moisture and many chemicals can compromise rope strength.
 Synthetic materials such as polypropylene, polyester, and nylon can offer some cushioning in the event that a worker does fall; this cushioning may reduce the probability that the worker suffers an injury.
 Safety ropes are required to be replaced every seven years (even if they do not appear to be damaged).

Amputation 

Lockout-tagout (LO/TO) practices can effectively mitigate worker exposure potential amputations from grain-handling equipment through confirming that machinery cannot be inadvertently energized while workers perform maintenance on equipment. OSHA has developed a specialized program that focuses organizational resources on addressing amputation hazards.  OSHA's Amputations National Emphasis Program specifically targets compliance with LO/TO and machine guarding standards.

Airborne contaminants 

The most simple mitigation strategy would be for workers to abstain from entering the storage bin, especially within three to four weeks following the addition of new silage.  In the event that a worker is required to enter the silo, the unit would be required to be ventilated (with a silage blower or ventilation fans) for a minimum of 30 minutes prior to entry, with ventilation fans running for the duration that the worker is in the bin.  Additional ventilation time is necessary when the silo diameter is greater than 24 feet or if the silage surface is greater than 15 feet from the top of the silo.

See also 
 Agricultural safety and health

References

Occupational hazards
Grain production
Agricultural health and safety